Cauchas terskella is a moth of the Adelidae family or fairy longhorn moths. It was described by Kuprijanov in 1994. It is found in south-eastern Kazakhstan.

References

Adelidae
Moths described in 1994
Insects of Central Asia